Lilyvale is a rural locality in the Central Highlands Region, Queensland, Australia.

History

References

Central Highlands Region
Localities in Queensland